The women's team compound archery competition at the 2017 Summer Universiade was held in the National Taiwan Sport University Stadium, Taipei, Taiwan between August 20 and the finals between August 22–23, 2017.

Records 
Prior to the competition, the world and Universiade records were as follows.

216 arrows ranking round

24 arrows final match

Ranking Round

Elimination round

Bronze medal

References 

Women's team compound